The Subaru G4e is a concept electric car developed by Japanese automaker Subaru in conjunction with Tokyo utility TEPCO as a possible successor to the R1e. It was unveiled at the 2007 Tokyo Motor Show.

Design

The G4e name is intended to stand for "Green for the Earth." The car seats five and has a wedge design with a low 0.276 drag coefficient, aided by the deletion of wing mirrors in favor of a-pillar mounted rearview cameras. Batteries are stored under the floor to maximize passenger space. The interior is trimmed in red and white, with a dashboard incorporating a large video screen in the center stack intended to be reminiscent of a waterfall.

Technical
A quick charge to 80 per cent of the batteries' capacity is possible in just 15 minutes.

The G4e uses a lithium-ion battery developed exclusively by Subaru which employs vanadium technology to allow the battery to store two to three times more lithium ions than conventional lithium-ion batteries. The car's battery pack provides 346 volts.

References

External links

 

Electric concept cars
G4e